Robert Ibertsberger (born 20 January 1977) is an Austrian football manager and a former player. He is the brother of Andreas Ibertsberger. He had to retire in 2004 due to serious knee injury.

Coaching career
Robert Ibertsberger became assistant manager of Wolfsberger AC in 2017. He then was appointed manager of Wolfsberg on 26 March 2018 and was manager until the end of the 2017–18 season. His first match was a 2–0 loss to Red Bull Salzburg. Ibertsberger left Wolfsberg to become assistant manager of Austria Wien. On 11 March 2019, Ibertsberger again replaced an outgoing manager. He replaced Thomas Letsch at Austria Wien. His first match was a 1–0 loss to Sturm Graz. He became manager of SKN St. Pölten on 9 March 2020. St. Pölten finished the 2019–20 season with five wins in ten league matches. St. Pölten's 2020–21 season started with a 3–1 win against ATSV Wolfsberg.

Inbertsberger was hired by SV Ried in January 2022 and then fired on 19 April 2022.

Managerial record

References

External links
 
 spox.com
 

1977 births
Living people
Austrian footballers
Association football defenders
Austria international footballers
SK Sturm Graz players
Venezia F.C. players
FC Red Bull Salzburg players
FC Tirol Innsbruck players
SC Untersiebenbrunn players
Austrian Football Bundesliga players
Serie A players
Austrian football managers
FK Austria Wien managers
SKN St. Pölten managers
SV Ried managers
Austrian Football Bundesliga managers
Austrian expatriate footballers
Austrian expatriate sportspeople in Italy
Expatriate footballers in Italy
People from Salzburg-Umgebung District
Footballers from Salzburg (state)